Dancing to Restore an Eclipsed Moon is the debut studio album of American post-punk band Red Temple Spirits. It was released in 1988 on the Nate Starkman & Son label, a subsidiary of Fundamental.

Track listing

Critical reception

Personnel 
Adapted from the Dancing to Restore an Eclipsed Moon liner notes.

Red Temple Spirits
 William Faircloth – vocals
 Dino Paredes – bass guitar
 Thomas Pierik – drums
 Dallas Taylor – guitar

Production and additional personnel
 Lowell F. Ford – photography
 Dave Peterson – production
 Biff Sanders – engineering

Release history

References

External links 
 

1988 debut albums
Red Temple Spirits albums